Statistics of L. League Cup in the 1999 season.

Overview
NTV Beleza won the championship.

Results

Preliminary round

East

West

First stage

Zone A

Zone B

Second stage

Zone High

Zone Low

Final round

Semifinals
OKI FC Winds 1-2 Prima Ham FC Kunoichi
Tasaki Perule FC 0-1 NTV Beleza

Third place match
OKI FC Winds 2-1 Tasaki Perule FC

Final
Prima Ham FC Kunoichi 0-1 NTV Beleza

References

Nadeshiko League Cup
1999 in Japanese women's football